The lumbricals are intrinsic muscles of the hand that flex the metacarpophalangeal joints, and extend the interphalangeal joints.

The lumbrical muscles of the foot also have a similar action, though they are of less clinical concern.

Structure 
The lumbricals are four, small, worm-like muscles on each hand. These muscles are unusual in that they do not attach to bone. Instead, they attach proximally to the tendons of flexor digitorum profundus, and distally to the extensor expansions. The first and second lumbricals are unipennate, while the third and fourth lumbricals are bipennate.

Nerve supply
The first and second lumbricals (the most radial two) are innervated by the median nerve. The third and fourth lumbricals (most ulnar two) are innervated by the deep branch of ulnar nerve.

This is the usual innervation of the lumbricals (occurring in 60% of individuals).  However 1:3 (median:ulnar - 20% of individuals) and 3:1 (median:ulnar - 20% of individuals) also exist.  The lumbrical innervation always follows the innervation pattern of the associated muscle unit of flexor digitorum profundus (i.e. if the muscle units supplying the tendon to the middle finger are innervated by the median nerve, the second lumbrical will also be innervated by the median nerve).

Blood supply
Four separate sources supply blood to these muscles: the superficial palmar arch, the common palmar digital artery, the deep palmar arch, and the dorsal digital artery.

Function 
The lumbrical muscles, with the help of the interosseous muscles, simultaneously flex the metacarpophalangeal joints while extending both interphalangeal joints of the digit on which it inserts. The lumbricals are used during an upstroke in writing.

Etymology 
The term "lumbrical" comes from the Latin, meaning "worm".

Additional images

References 

Muscles of the upper limb
Hand